The 2010–11 FK-League was the second season of the FK-League. The season began on 3 December 2010, and ended on 5 March 2011. All matches were played at Yongin Gymnasium, Yongin.

Teams
 Jeonju MAG FC
 FS Seoul
 Seoul Gwangjin FC
 Yes Gumi FC
 Yongin FS

League table

Champions

Awards
 Most Valuable Player : Heo Chang-Woo (FS Seoul)
 Best Goalscorer : Shin Jong-hoon (FS Seoul, 22 goals) 
 Best Goalkeeper : Heo Myung-Beom (FS Seoul) 
 Best Manager : Lee Chang-Hwan (FS Seoul) 
 Fair Play Team : Yongin FS

References

FK-League
2010 in futsal
2011 in futsal